Twelve Days may refer to:

12 Days manga
12 Days of Brumalia
Twelve days of Christmas
The Twelve Days of Christmas (song)
The twelve days, July 24th to August 4th, 1914, at the end of the July Crisis, preceding the outbreak of World War I